Erica Sigurdson (born 5 November 1974) is a Canadian comedian, writer, producer, and haberdasher. Sigurdson has Icelandic ancestry. She is a two-time Canadian Comedy Award nominee, a Leo Award winning comedy writer and is regularly featured on CBC Radio's smash hit The Debaters. She has been performing stand-up across Canada for ten years, has traveled to Afghanistan to entertain the troops and was a semi-finalist in the Seattle International Comedy Competition. She is a nine-time repeat guest on the Maximum Fun show Stop Podcasting Yourself.

Filmography

References

Canadian stand-up comedians
Living people
Canadian women comedians
1974 births
Canadian television writers
Canadian women television writers
21st-century Canadian comedians
21st-century Canadian screenwriters